Tero Välimaa (born August 10, 1978 in Göteborg, Västra Götaland) is a retired male butterfly swimmer from Finland, who was born in Sweden. He competed for Finland at the 2000 Summer Olympics in Sydney, Australia.

References
sports-reference

1978 births
Living people
Finnish male butterfly swimmers
Swimmers at the 2000 Summer Olympics
Olympic swimmers of Finland
People from Gothenburg
SK Neptun swimmers